The 1978 Women's World Chess Championship was won by Maia Chiburdanidze, who defeated the incumbent champion Nona Gaprindashvili At only 17 years of age, Chiburdanidze became the sixth and youngest Women's World Champion (Gaprindashvili had been 20 when she first won the title).

1976 Interzonals

For the first time, the women's cycle contained not one but two Interzonal tournaments, held in Roosendaal, Netherlands and Tbilisi, Georgian SSR in November and December 1976, featuring the best players from each FIDE zone. A total of 25 players took part, with the top three from each Interzonal qualifying for the Candidates Tournament.

Akhmilovskaya and former three-time challenger Kushnir (now representing Israel) shared first place in Roosendaal, while Lematschko took the third and last spot in the Candidates after a playoff against van der Mije.

In Tbilisi, Fatalibekova won, half a point ahead of Kozlovskaya and 15-year-old prodigy Chiburdanidze.

{| class="wikitable"
|+ 1976 Women's Interzonal, Roosendaal
|-
! !! Player !! 1 !! 2 !! 3 !! 4 !! 5 !! 6 !! 7 !! 8 !! 9 !! 10 !! 11 !! 12 !! 13 !! 14 !! Points !! Tie break
|- style="background:#cfc;"
| 1 ||  || - || ½ || 0 || 1 || ½ || 1 || ½ || ½ || 1 || 1 || ½ || 1 || 1 || 1 || 9½ || 54.25
|- style="background:#cfc;"
| 2 ||  || ½ || - || ½ || 0 || 1 || ½ || ½ || 1 || 1 || 1 || 1 || ½ || 1 || 1 || 9½ || 54.00
|-
| 3 ||  || 1 || ½ || - || 1 || ½ || ½ || 1 || ½ || ½ || 0 || ½ || 1 || 1 || 1 || 9 || 54.75
|- style="background:#cfc;"
| 4 ||  || 0 || 1 || 0 || - || 0 || 1 || ½ || 1 || 1 || 1 || ½ || 1 || 1 || 1 || 9 || 49.00
|-
| 5 ||  || ½ || 0 || ½ || 1 || - || ½ || 1 || 0 || ½ || 1 || ½ || 1 || 1 || 1 || 8½ || 
|-
| 6 ||  || 0 || ½ || ½ || 0 || ½ || - || ½ || 1 || ½ || ½ || 1 || ½ || 1 || 1 || 7½ || 
|-
| 7 ||  || ½ || ½ || 0 || ½ || 0 || ½ || - || ½ || ½ || 1 || 1 || ½ || ½ || 1 || 7 || 
|-
| 8 ||  || ½ || 0 || ½ || 0 || 1 || 0 || ½ || - || 0 || 1 || ½ || ½ || 1 || 1 || 6½ || 34.75
|-
| 9 ||  || 0 || 0 || ½ || 0 || ½ || ½ || ½ || 1 || - || 0 || ½ || 1 || 1 || 1 || 6½ || 32.50
|-
| 10 ||  || 0 || 0 || 1 || 0 || 0 || ½ || 0 || 0 || 1 || - || 1 || ½ || 1 || ½ || 5½ || 
|-
| 11 ||  || ½ || 0 || ½ || ½ || ½ || 0 || 0 || ½ || ½ || 0 || - || 1 || 0 || 1 || 5 || 
|-
| 12 ||  || 0 || ½ || 0 || 0 || 0 || ½ || ½ || ½ || 0 || ½ || 0 || - || 1 || ½ || 4 || 
|-
| 13 ||  || 0 || 0 || 0 || 0 || 0 || 0 || ½ || 0 || 0 || 0 || 1 || 0 || - || 1 || 2½ || 
|-
| 14 ||  || 0 || 0 || 0 || 0 || 0 || 0 || 0 || 0 || 0 || ½ || 0 || ½ || 0 || - || 1 || 
|}

{| class="wikitable"
|+ 1976 Women's Interzonal, Tbilisi
|-
! !! Player !! 1 !! 2 !! 3 !! 4 !! 5 !! 6 !! 7 !! 8 !! 9 !! 10 !! 11 !! Points !! Tie break
|- style="background:#cfc;"
| 1 ||  || - || ½ || 1 || ½ || ½ || ½ || ½ || 1 || ½ || 1 || 1 || 7 || 
|- style="background:#cfc;"
| 2 ||  || ½ || - || 1 || 0 || ½ || 1 || 1 || ½ || 1 || ½ || ½ || 6½ || 31.25
|- style="background:#cfc;"
| 3 ||  || 0 || 0 || - || 1 || 1 || ½ || ½ || 1 || 1 || ½ || 1 || 6½ || 28.75
|-
| 4 ||  || ½ || 1 || 0 || - || 1 || ½ || ½ || ½ || 0 || 1 || 1 || 6 || 28.00
|-
| 5 ||  || ½ || ½ || 0 || 0 || - || ½ || 1 || ½ || 1 || 1 || 1 || 6 || 25.00
|-
| 6 ||  || ½ || 0 || ½ || ½ || ½ || - || 0 || ½ || 1 || ½ || 1 || 5 || 
|-
| 7 ||  || ½ || 0 || ½ || ½ || 0 || 1 || - || ½ || ½ || 0 || 1 || 4½ || 21.00
|-
| 8 ||  || 0 || ½ || 0 || ½ || ½ || ½ || ½ || - || ½ || 1 || ½ || 4½ || 20.00
|-
| 9 ||  || ½ || 0 || 0 || 1 || 0 || 0 || ½ || ½ || - || ½ || 1 || 4 || 
|-
| 10 ||  || 0 || ½ || ½ || 0 || 0 || ½ || 1 || 0 || ½ || - || 0 || 3 || 
|-
| 11 ||  || 0 || ½ || 0 || 0 || 0 || 0 || 0 || ½ || 0 || 1 || - || 2 || 
|}

1977-78 Candidates matches

The top three from each of the two Interzonals were joined by seeded players Alexandria and Levitina, the finalists from the last Candidates Tournament. These eight players contested a knock-out series of matches. Sixteen-year-old Chiburdanidze beat Kushnir in the final, earning the right to challenge reigning champion Gaprindashvili.

1978 Championship Match

The championship match was played in Tbilisi in 1978. A close match ended with a victory for 17-year-old Chiburdanidze against her twenty-year older opponent.

{| class="wikitable" style="text-align:center"
|+Women's World Championship Match 1978
|-
! !! 1 !! 2 !! 3 !! 4 !! 5 !! 6 !! 7 !! 8 !! 9 !! 10 !! 11 !! 12 !! 13 !! 14 !! 15 !! Total
|-
| align=left | 
| ½ ||style="background:black; color:white"| ½ || ½ ||style="background:black; color:white"| 1 || 1 ||style="background:black; color:white"| ½ || 0 ||style="background:black; color:white"| ½ || 1 ||style="background:black; color:white"| ½ || 0 ||style="background:black; color:white"| ½ || 1 ||style="background:black; color:white"| ½ || ½ || 8½
|-
| align=left | 
|style="background:black; color:white"| ½ || ½ ||style="background:black; color:white"| ½ || 0 ||style="background:black; color:white"| 0 || ½ ||style="background:black; color:white"| 1 || ½ ||style="background:black; color:white"| 0 || ½ ||style="background:black; color:white"| 1 || ½ ||style="background:black; color:white"| 0 || ½ ||style="background:black; color:white"| ½ || 6½
|}

References

Women's World Chess Championships
1978 in chess